Fritz Darrell Brickell (March 19, 1935 – October 15, 1965) was an American professional baseball player who played in parts of three seasons for the New York Yankees (1958–59) and Los Angeles Angels (1961) of Major League Baseball. He was the son of former Major League outfielder Fred Brickell.

Brickell was born and raised in Wichita, Kansas.  He attended East High School in Wichita, where he appears in its yearbook on both the football and basketball teams, but not on the baseball team, then graduated in 1953.

His eight years in the Yankee farm system (1953–60) were interrupted by two trials with the Bombers. His ten hits included his only MLB home run, a two-run shot off former Yankee Tom Morgan, then with the Detroit Tigers.

After spending 1960 in Triple-A, Brickell was traded to the expansion Angels on the eve of the  season. He was the first starting shortstop in Angels' franchise history: on April 11, 1961, at Memorial Stadium, he went one-for-four at bat and handled nine chances in the field, turning a double play but committing two errors, as the Angels shocked the Baltimore Orioles, 7–2.

But Brickell struggled on both offense and defense, batting only .122 in 49 at bats and making seven errors in 71 total chances (for a .901 fielding percentage). He started his last game on May 8, and spent most of 1961 with the Toronto Maple Leafs of the International League. All told, In 41 MLB games, Brickell collected 16 hits, including two for extra bases. He played in the minors through 1962.

Brickell died from cancer of the jaw at the age of 30.

See also
List of second-generation Major League Baseball players

References

External links

1935 births
1965 deaths
Baseball players from Wichita, Kansas
Binghamton Triplets players
Birmingham Barons players
Deaths from cancer in Kansas
Denver Bears players
Joplin Miners players
Los Angeles Angels players
Louisville Colonels (minor league) players
Major League Baseball shortstops
New York Yankees players
Richmond Virginians (minor league) players
St. Joseph Saints players
Toronto Maple Leafs (International League) players